Baby VOX is the 2nd and final studio album released by South Korean girl group, Baby VOX Re.V. It was released in South Korea on July 11, 2008 by DR Music. I Believe served as the album's lead single. Baby VOX is the only album that features members Oh Min Jin and Park So Ri, following the departures of Myung Sa Rang and Han Aeri the previous year.

Track listing
 I Believe
 Sexy
 Why
 Crazy (You Drive Me Crazy)
 Permission
 Fake Love
 What Am I to Do
 Never Say Goodbye (Chinese Version)
 I Believe (Instrumental)
 Crazy (You Drive Me Crazy) (Instrumental)

References

DR Music albums
2008 albums